Catawba County is a county in the U.S. state of North Carolina. As of the 2020 census, the population was 160,610. Its county seat is Newton, and its largest city is Hickory. The county is part of the Hickory–Lenoir–Morganton, NC Metropolitan Statistical Area.

History
Catawba County formed in 1842 from Lincoln County, was named after the Catawba River. The word "catawba" is rooted in the Choctaw sound kat'a pa, loosely translated as "to divide or separate, to break." However, scholars are fairly certain that this word was imposed from outside. 
The Native Americans who once inhabited the region known as the Catawba people, were considered one of the most powerful Southeastern Siouan-speaking tribes in the Carolina Piedmont. They now live along the border of North Carolina, near the city of Rock Hill, South Carolina. Scots-Irish and German colonial immigrants first settled in the Catawba River valley in the mid-18th century. An official history of the Scots-Irish and German settlement was documented in 1954, by Charles J. Preslar Jr, and more recently by a series of three books by Gary Freeze, called The Catawbans.

Geography

State and local protected areas/sites 
 Houck's Chapel
 Mountain Creek Park
 Murray's Mill Historic Site
 Old Hickory Tavern Birthplace of Hickory
 Old Piedmont Wagon

Major water bodies 
 Balls Creek
 Betts Creek
 Catawba River
 Clark Creek
 Henry Fork (South Fork Catawba River tributary)
 Jacob Fork (South Fork Catawba River tributary)
 Lake Hickory
 Lake Norman
 Lookout Shoals Lake
 Lyle Creek
 McLin Creek
 Muddy Creek
 Pinch Gut Creek
 Pott Creek
 Snow Creek
 South Fork Catawba River

Adjacent counties
Alexander County – north
Iredell County – east
Lincoln County – south
Caldwell County – northwest
Burke County – west

Major highways

 
 
 
 
 
 
  (Lowesville–Denver Business Route)
  (Newton–Conover Business Route) 
  (Truck Route)

Major infrastructure 
 Hickory Regional Airport (partially in Burke County)

Rail and mass transit 
With approximately twenty freight trains a day, Catawba County is a freight railroad transportation center. This is largely due to the areas strong manufacturing based economy, and its placement along the Norfolk Southern Railway line. The Caldwell County Railroad also serves the county and interchanges with Norfolk Southern in Hickory.

Conover has been designated as the Catawba County passenger rail stop for the Western North Carolina Railroad planned to run from Salisbury, NC, to Asheville.

The Greenway Public Transportation bus service serves the cities of Conover, Hickory, and Newton.

Demographics

2020 census

As of the 2020 United States census, there were 160,610 people, 62,417 households, and 41,861 families residing in the county.

2010 census
As of the census of 2010, there were 154,358 people, 55,533 households, and 39,095 families residing in the county.  The population density was 354 people per square mile (137/km2).  There were 59,919 housing units at an average density of 150 per square mile (58/km2).  The racial makeup of the county was 87.1% White, 8.5% Black or African American, 0.3% Native American, 3.1% Asian, 0.05% Pacific Islander, and 1.14% from two or more races, 9.4% of the population were Hispanic or Latino of any race.

There were 55,533 households, out of which 31.50% had children under the age of 18 living with them, 55.10% were married couples living together, 10.90% had a female householder with no husband present, and 29.60% were non-families. 24.60% of all households were made up of individuals, and 9.10% had someone living alone who was 65 years of age or older.  The average household size was 2.51 and the average family size was 2.98.

In the county, the population was spread out, with 24.30% under the age of 18, 8.80% from 18 to 24, 31.10% from 25 to 44, 23.50% from 45 to 64, and 12.30% who were 65 years of age or older.  The median age was 36 years. For every 100 females there were 97.30 males.  For every 100 females age 18 and over, there were 94.70 males.

The median income for a household in the county was $43,536, and the median income for a family was $47,474. Males had a median income of $30,822 versus $23,352 for females. The per capita income for the county was $20,358.  About 6.50% of families and 9.10% of the population were below the poverty line, including 12.50% of those under age 18 and 9.70% of those age 65 or over.

Government, public safety, and politics
Catawba County is a member of the regional Western Piedmont Council of Governments. The county has been represented primarily by Republicans since World War II: no Democratic Presidential candidate has won Catawba County since Franklin D. Roosevelt in 1944. Jimmy Carter is the last Democrat to manage even 40 percent of the county's vote.

County officers

Board of Commissioners

Soil and Water Conservation District Supervisors

Superior Court Judges

District Court Judges

Catawba County Sheriff
The Catawba County Sheriff's Office consists of 198 Deputies and Employees. It provides court protection, jail administration, patrol and detective services for all unincorporated county areas, serves civil process and criminal papers, provides School Resource Officers at County High and Middle Schools and CV Community College, and narcotics crime investigation. Newton, Hickory, Conover, and Maiden have municipal police departments. The North Carolina Bureau of Investigation, the SBI, provides investigative assistance to local law enforcement agencies when requested by the sheriff, local police departments, the district attorney, or judges.

Other offices

North Carolina General Assembly

North Carolina Senate

North Carolina House of Representatives

Federal offices

Senate

House of Representatives

Economy
Catawba County is part of the "North Carolina Data Center Corridor" in western North Carolina. The town of Maiden is home to the Apple iCloud data center and is the largest privately owned solar farm in the United States (operated by Apple). As of 2017, the Catawba County Economic Development Corporation controls a 55-acre business park in Conover designed for data centers and office use. CommScope, Inc., and Corning Corp., manufacturers of fiber optic cabling, became the region's largest employers in the late 1990s. The city of Hickory is home to Lenoir–Rhyne University, the Hickory Motor Speedway, and the minor league baseball team the Hickory Crawdads. The town of Conover is home to the Greater Hickory Classic at Rock Barn.

Education
 Most of the county is served by Catawba County Schools.
 Newton and Conover are served by Newton-Conover City Schools.
 Most of Hickory is served by the Hickory City School System.

Higher education
 Lenoir–Rhyne University
 Catawba Valley Community College
 Appalachian Center at Hickory
 NC Center for Engineering Technologies

Libraries
 The Catawba County Library System serves the residents of Catawba County. The library system operates 7 libraries throughout the county.
 The Hickory Public Library System serves the residents of Hickory. The library system operates 2 libraries: The Patrick Beaver Memorial Library and the Ridgeview Library.

Points of Interest

Museums and historical sites
 Catawba County Firefighters Museum
 Catawba County Museum of History
 Hickory Aviation Museum
 Hickory Museum of Art
 Catawba Science Center
 Murrays Mill
 Bunker Hill Covered Bridge
 Piedmont Wagon Company

Sports and entertainment
 Hickory Crawdads
 Hickory Motor Speedway

Music and performing arts
 Newton-Conover Auditorium
 The Green-Room Theatre
 Western Piedmont Symphony
 Hickory Community Theatre

Other attractions
 Valley Hills Mall
 Lake Norman
 Lake Hickory
 Lake Lookout

Communities

Cities
 Claremont
 Conover
 Hickory (largest city)
 Newton (county seat)

Towns
 Brookford
 Catawba
 Long View
 Maiden

Census-designated places
 Lake Norman of Catawba
 Mountain View
 St. Stephens

Unincorporated communities
 Banoak
 Sherrills Ford
 Terrell

Townships

 Bandy's
 Caldwell
 Catawba
 Clines
 Hickory
 Jacobs Fork
 Mountain Creek
 Newton

See also
 List of counties in North Carolina
 National Register of Historic Places listings in Catawba County, North Carolina

References

Further reading
 Freeze, Gary R. The Catawbans: Crafters of a North Carolina County, 1747–1900 Catawba County Historical Association, 1995. .
 Freeze, Gary R. The Catawbans: Pioneers in Progress, Vol. 2. Catawba County Historical Association, 2002.

External links

 
 
 Catawba County Chamber of Commerce

 
Charlotte metropolitan area